A springform pan is a type of bakeware that features sides that can be removed from the base. Springform refers to the construction style of this pan. The base and the sides are separate pieces that are held together when the base is aligned with a groove that rings the bottom of the walls. The pan is then secured by a latch on the exterior of the wall. This tightens the 'belt' that becomes the walls of the pan and secures the base into the groove at the base of the walls.

Design
The most common springform pan is the nine-inch round. However, small circular pans are common along with squares, rectangles, and hearts. They come in a variety of materials including anodized aluminum, heavy-gauge steel, and glass. Optional features include a non-stick surface and a waterproofing seal around the base.

This pan is used to bake dishes that cannot be easily inverted for removal from the pan. Some of the most common recipes to call for springform pans are cheesecakes and tortes. The easy removal of the sides from a springform pan lends itself to dishes with delicate bottom layers such as the graham cracker crumb crusts commonly constructed for cheesecakes. Springform pans, however, are also used in the preparation of pizzas, quiches, and frozen desserts.

Although most cheesecakes are baked in a water bath, this does not mean that springform pans are waterproof around the base. Many may be waterproof initially. However, as the latch loosens and the coating wears off this waterproof feature will fade. For this reason many will wrap the pan in aluminum foil.

There are many types and finishes of springform pans. While the most common bottom is smooth, bottoms can also be waffled or glass.

Springform pan alternatives
If a springform pan is unavailable, bakers may choose any of the following options:
 serve cake from a pan
 line cake pan with parchment paper
 use a silicone pan
 use a disposable aluminum pan
 use a removable-bottom non-springform pan

See also
 List of cooking vessels

References

External links

Cookware and bakeware
Food preparation utensils
Cooking vessels